Number 9 Squadron (otherwise known as No. IX (Bomber) Squadron or No. IX (B) Squadron) is the oldest dedicated Bomber Squadron of the Royal Air Force. Formed in December 1914, it saw service throughout the First World War, including at the Somme and Passchendaele. During the Second World War, No. IX (B) Squadron was one of two Avro Lancaster units specialising in heavy precision bombing (the other was No. 617 Squadron) and sank the battleship Tirpitz on 12 November 1944 in Operation Catechism. Between 1962 and April 1982, the squadron flew the Avro Vulcan B.2 as part of the V-Force. In June 1982, it became the first front-line squadron in the world to operate the Panavia Tornado GR.1. In May 1998, No. IX (B) Squadron received the RAF's first Tornado GR.4, which it operated until reequipping with the Eurofighter Typhoon FGR.4 at its present home base of RAF Lossiemouth on 1 April 2019.

History

First World War

No. 9 Squadron was formed on 8 December 1914 at Saint-Omer in France, the first outside of the UK, from a detachment of the Royal Flying Corps (RFC) HQ Wireless Flight. Known as No. 9 (Wireless) Squadron, it was tasked with developing the use of radio for reconnaissance missions through artillery spotting. This lasted until 22 March 1915 when the squadron was disbanded and had its equipment dispersed amongst Nos. II, V, 6 and 16 Squadron.

The squadron reformed at Brooklands on 1 April 1915 under the command of Major Hugh Dowding (later commander of RAF Fighter Command during the Battle of Britain) as a radio-training squadron, flying the Farman MF.7, Blériot XI and Royal Aircraft Factory B.E.2s. The Bats moved to Dover on 23 July, re-equipping with the Royal Aircraft Factory B.E.8a, Avro 504 and a single Martinsyde S.1, before returning to Saint-Omer on 12 December as an army co-operation squadron. Moving to Bertangles on 24 December, No. 9 Squadron commenced bombing missions on 17 January 1916 with the B.E.2c. It flew reconnaissance and artillery spotting missions during the Battle of the Somme in 1916, assisting XIII Corps on the first day. It later operated during the Second Battle of Arras in 1917.

It re-equipped with Royal Aircraft Factory R.E.8s in May 1917, using them for artillery spotting and contact patrols during the Battle of Passchendaele, during which it suffered 57 casualties, and carrying out short range tactical bombing operations in response to the German spring offensive in March 1918. While it started to receive Bristol Fighters in July 1918, it did not completely discard its R.E.8s until after the end of the war. No. 9 Squadron returned to the UK in August 1919, arriving at Castle Bromwich where it remained until disbanding on 31 December 1919.

Between the wars
The squadron's life as a bomber unit began on 1 April 1924, reforming at RAF Upavon, quickly moving to RAF Manston, with the Vickers Vimy. Less than a year later, the squadron re-equipped with the Vickers Virginia heavy bomber, occasionally supplemented by Vickers Victoria transports, which it retained until this was replaced by the Handley Page Heyford in 1936.

The squadron badge was approved by King Edward VIII in 1936, one of the few to be introduced during his short reign. The badge reflects the squadron's development as a specialized night-operations unit, and is a gentle leg-pull in the direction of Air Marshal Hugh "Boom" Trenchard, widely credited as the founder of the RAF as an independent military force, who once famously remarked "Only bats and bloody fools fly at night!" The squadron emblem is accordingly a bat, with the motto "We Fly by Night".

On 31 January 1939, No. IX Squadron became the third RAF squadron to receive the modern Vickers Wellington monoplane, when their first Wellington arrived at RAF Stradishall – reaching full strength by April.

Second World War

1939–1943

The Second World War began with the unit one of the few equipped with modern aircraft, the Vickers Wellington bomber, flying out of RAF Honington; the Wellington later gave way to the Avro Lancaster in September 1942 upon the squadron's move to RAF Waddington, with which the unit would complete its most famous sorties.

On 4 September 1939, the squadron’s Wellington aircraft and crews were the first to hit the enemy, the first to get into a dogfight, possibly the first to shoot down an enemy aircraft, the first to be shot down by one and, towards the end of the war, the first to hit the German battleship Tirpitz with the Tallboy 12,000-pound bomb, an achievement by the crew of an Avro Lancaster on her 102nd operation with the squadron.

No. IX Squadron fought with RAF Bomber Command in Europe all the way through the Second World War, took part in all the major raids and big battles, pioneered and proved new tactics and equipment, produced several of the leading figures in The Great Escape, such as Les 'Cookie' Long, as well as Colditz inmates – including the legendary 'Medium Sized Man' Flight Lieutenant Dominic Bruce OBE MC AFM originator of the famous 'tea chest' escape. They became one of the two specialised squadrons attacking precision targets with the Tallboy bomb, and led the final main force raid, on Berchtesgaden, 25 April 1945.

The sinking of Tirpitz (1944)
The battleship  had been moved into a fjord in Northern Norway where she threatened the Arctic convoys and was too far north to be attacked by air from the UK.  She had already been damaged by a Royal Navy midget submarine attack and a second attack from carrier born aircraft of the Fleet Air Arm. But both attacks had failed to sink her. The task was given to No. 9 and No. 617 Squadrons who, operating from a base in Russia, attacked Tirpitz with Tallboy bombs which damaged her so extensively that she was sent to Tromsø to be used as a floating battery. This fjord was in range of bombers operating from Scotland. There in October from a base in Scotland she was attacked again. Finally on 12 November 1944, the two squadrons attacked Tirpitz.  The first bombs missed their target, but following aircraft scored three direct hits in quick succession causing the ship to capsize. All three RAF attacks on Tirpitz were led by Wing Commander J. B. "Willy" Tait, who had succeeded Cheshire as CO of No. 617 Squadron in July 1944. Both squadrons claim that it was their bombs that actually sank Tirpitz, however it was the Tallboy bomb dropped from a No. 9 Sqn Lancaster WS-Y (LM220) piloted by Flying Officer Dougie Tweddle to which the sinking of the warship is attributed. F/O Tweddle was awarded the Distinguished Flying Cross (DFC) for his part in the operations against Tirpitz. F/O Tweddle's DFC citation reads as follows, "This officer has taken part in all three attacks on the battleship 'Tirpitz'. He has shown great determination and the keenest enthusiasm to operate and bomb his target in spite of all the hazards of enemy opposition and bad weather. In the first attack he made the long and arduous journey to the Russian base, and in the actual attack made every effort to bomb the target, despite cloud and smoke-screen. In the second attack he made the same endeavours to bomb the ship, and on the third occasion, unhampered by weather, launched his attack successfully. F/O Tweddle has always displayed courage and cheerful enthusiasm which has been of utmost value to his crew, whilst his captaincy and airmanship have consistently been of the highest order. In addition, F/O Tweddle undertook the extra hazard of wind finding for the Squadron, a task he accomplished most successfully, thereby contributing to the success of the operations even further."

Tirpitz Bulkhead
Due to the sinking of Tirpitz having been attributed to No. IX (B) Squadron, an intense rivalry developed between No. 617 (a.k.a. the Junior Squadron) and No. IX (B) Squadron after the sinking of the warship. The Tirpitz Bulkhead that was presented to Bomber Command by the Royal Norwegian Air Force, in commemoration of friendship and co-operation during World War II was of particular interest with both squadrons "owning" the bulkhead at various times until 2002 when the bulkhead was presented to the Bomber Command Museum.

1945
On 25 April 1945, No. IX Squadron flew their last operational mission of the war when they, along with No. 617 Squadron, attacked Obersalzberg – targeting the Berghof, Eagle's Nest (residences of Adolf Hitler) and the local SS barracks. 17 Lancasters of No. IX Squadron participated, with 11 bombing the primary target and one bombing a local bridge. With the end of the war in Europe, No. IX Squadron was assigned to the 'Tiger Force', which was composed of multiple Bomber Command squadrons, with the intention of striking the Japanese Empire. However, due to the Atomic bombings of Hiroshima and Nagasaki in August 1945 the war was brought to an end before this could be carried out, although No. IX Squadron was deployed to India to carry out aerial survey work until April 1946.

Post–War

After the War, the Lancasters were replaced by Avro Lincolns until 1952, when the squadron re-equipped with English Electric Canberra B.2 jet-bombers. These aircraft were used during three months of operations in Malaya in 1956 and during the Suez Crisis. No. IX (Bomber) Squadron was disbanded on 13 July 1961.

Reforming on 1 March 1962 at RAF Coningsby, No. IX (B) Squadron converted to the Avro Vulcan B.2 and became part of the V-Force of RAF Bomber Command. Their Vulcans were equipped in late 1966 with WE.177 laydown nuclear bombs at RAF Cottesmore in the low-level penetration role and assigned to SACEUR, before spending six years in the same role 1969-74 at RAF Akrotiri, Cyprus, as part of the Near East Air Force Wing (NEAF) where the squadron formed part of the United Kingdom's commitment to CENTO. The years 1975-82 were spent based at RAF Waddington, again assigned to SACEUR, and still equipped with WE.177 nuclear laydown bombs in the low-level penetration role before disbanding in April 1982.

Tornado GR (1982–2019)

1982–1990 (Honington to Brüggen)
No. IX (B) Squadron began to form at RAF Honington in Suffolk in early 1982 under Wing Commander P. J. Gooding, with the squadron receiving its first Panavia Tornado GR.1 ZA586 on 6 January. The first IX (B) Squadron Tornado GR.1 sortie was made from RAF Honington on 6 April. The squadron was officially reformed on 1 June thus becoming the world's first operational Tornado squadron. No. 9 Squadron was again equipped with WE.177 nuclear laydown bombs, handed down from the Vulcan force. The squadron was officially declared combat ready to SACEUR in January 1983. No. IX (B) Squadron suffered the RAF's first Tornado loss on 27 September 1983, when Tornado GR.1 ZA586 suffered complete electrical failure causing the pilot Sqn. Ldr. M. Stephens to order ejection. The navigator, Flt. Lt. N. Nickles, safely ejected from the aircraft however Sqn. Ldr. M. Stephens failed to eject and was lost in the crash.

During their time at RAF Honington, the squadron featured in the 1985 RAF recruitment film Tornado, produced by the Central Office of Information. The film features a training exercise in which Tornado crews prepare and execute a strike on a coastal surface-to-air missile site. On 1 October 1986, No. IX (B) Squadron moved to RAF Brüggen as part of RAF Germany, becoming the fourth Tornado squadron to be based there.

1991–1998 (Op GRANBY, 1991)

In the build up to the First Gulf War in 1990, personnel of No. IX (B) Squadron were deployed to Tabuk Air Base and Dhahran Airfield in Saudi Arabia as well as Muharraq Airfield in Bahrain. As part of Operation Granby, crews from these bases flew their first sorties on 17 January 1991 to gain air superiority over Iraqi airspace. Initial bombing raids were focused on Iraqi air bases with Tornado GR.1s delivering unguided 1000lb bombs and JP233 to knock out runways. On 20 January, the squadron lost Tornado GR.1 ZD893 near Tabuk when its control column failed to respond properly shortly after take off. After jettisoning their external stores, the crew attempted two landings to no avail forcing the crew to eject.  Over the course of the campaign, No. IX (B) Squadron flew 200 sorties dropping 300 1000lb bombs. The squadron suffered no loses in combat throughout the conflict, only losing ZD893 outside of combat.

In the aftermath of Op GRANBY, no-fly zones were set up over Iraq: Op WARDEN beginning in 1991 in the North and Op JURAL in the South in 1992. No. IX (B) Squadron along with other RAF Brüggen-based squadrons, Nos. 14, 17 and 31, each conducted four month long tours of duty as part of Operation Jural. Returning home to RAF Brüggen after Operation Granby, No. IX (B) Squadron continued to maintain their nuclear delivery role until 1994. On 11 May 1998, the first Tornado GR.4 was delivered to No. IX (B) Squadron at RAF Brüggen. The 1998 Strategic Defence Review decided that in 2001 No. 9 Squadron, along with No. 31 Squadron, would relocate from RAF Brüggen to RAF Marham, Norfolk.

1999–2002 (Op ENGADINE, 1999)
No. IX (B) Squadron participated in the 1999 NATO bombing of Yugoslavia to liberate Kosovo as part of Operation Engadine (called Operation Allied Force by NATO). Initial sorties were flown from RAF Brüggen but the squadron later deployed to Solenzara Air Base, Corsica, along with No. 31 Squadron. In 1999, No. IX (B) Squadron became the first operational Tornado GR.4 squadron.

2003–2009 (Op TELIC, 2003)
Under the command of Wing Commander Derek Watson, the squadron formed a part of the RAF's contribution to the Second Gulf War (Operation Telic) after being deployed in February 2003. Nos. II (AC), IX (B), XIII, 31 and 617 Squadrons contributed to Tornado GR.4 Wing 1 based at Ali Al Salem Air Base, Kuwait. No. IX (B) Squadron suffered its only loss of the war on 22 March 2003 when one of their aircraft was engaged by a Patriot battery in Kuwait while returning from a mission. The pilot, Flt. Lt. Kevin Barry Main, and navigator, Flt. Lt. David Rhys Williams, were both killed. Immediately after the incident it was claimed that the RAF crew had failed to switch on their IFF beacon. However a US journalist embedded with the U.S. Army unit operating the Patriot battery said the "army Patriots were mistakenly identifying friendly aircraft as enemy tactical ballistic missiles."

While all Tornado GR.4s were capable of carrying the ALARM anti-radiation missile, Nos. IX (B) and 31 Squadrons specialised in the role, in which they were known as "Pathfinder" squadrons. From 2004 to 2010, No. 9 Squadron annually deployed in support of Op TELIC.

2010 (Op HERRICK, 2010)
No. IX (B) Squadron saw its first tour of duty on Operation Herrick at Kandahar Airfield, Afghanistan in early January 2010, taking over from No. 31 Squadron. The squadron's Tornado GR.4s flew both close air support (CAS) missions for ground forces as well as flying multiple reconnaissance missions using the RAPTOR (Reconnaissance Airborne Pod for Tornado) and LITENING III pod. No. IX (B) Squadron handed over their duties to No. II (AC) Squadron on 13 April after a three month deployment. In that time the squadron launched 450 times, amassed nearly 1,600 flying hours and undertook almost 40 CAS missions. The penultimate leg of the squadron's journey home was completed aboard HMS Albion from Santander due to air travel disruption after the 2010 Eyjafjallajökull eruption.

2011 (Op ELLAMY, 2011)
In March 2011, No. IX(B) Squadron was the first RAF Tornado squadron to participate in Operation Ellamy. The squadron performed the second-longest ranged attack sorties in the history of the RAF and the first to be launched from the UK mainland since the Second World War, launching Storm Shadow strikes from the squadron's home base at RAF Marham and hitting targets deep inside Libya. The squadron then deployed forward to continue operations from Gioia del Colle in Southern Italy. After a brief respite from the action, during which it was relieved by No. II (AC) Squadron, No. IX (B) Squadron was selected to return to Gioia del Colle. Aircrew of No. IX (B) Squadron were inside Libyan airspace on 20 October 2011 when the conflict came to an end with the capture of Colonel Gaddafi by NTC fighters. The squadron returned home on 1 November 2011 after participating in one of the most successful NATO operations ever conducted (Operation Unified Protector). Nos. IX (B), II (AC) and 47 Squadrons were the only RAF squadrons awarded the right to emblazon the battle honour Libya 2011 on their squadron standards.

2012–2014 (Op HERRICK, 2012–14)
No. IX (B) Squadron returned to Kandahar Airfield in Afghanistan as part of Operation HERRICK in December 2012, taking over from No. II (AC) Squadron. No. IX (B) Squadron were deployed for four months before returning to RAF Marham on 18 March 2013. The squadron participated in Exercise Red Flag 14-1 at Nellis Air Force Base, U.S.A., between 27 January to 14 February 2014, operating alongside and against the United States Air Force, Navy, Marine Corps and the Royal Australian Air Force. 

No. IX (B) Squadron's last deployment to Afghanistan was in June 2014 when they again took over from No. II (AC) Squadron before being replaced by No. 31 Squadron in September – the last RAF Tornados to be deployed. To celebrate 100 years of No. IX (B) Squadron, Tornado GR.4 ZA356 was painted in a special commemorative scheme to mark the occasion.

2014–2019 (Op SHADER, 2014–19)

After an emergency meeting at the Cabinet Office Briefing Rooms on 11 August 2014, it was decided to deploy RAF Tornado GR.4s from RAF Marham to RAF Akrotiri to help support aid efforts to refugees in the Iraqi Sinjar Mountains who were under attack by Daesh. On 26 September, Parliament voted in favour of airstrikes against IS, with the first strikes occurring on the 30 September. No. IX(B) Squadron contributed to the 1,300 missions conducted by RAF Tornado GR.4s and General Atomics MQ-9 Reapers during the first year of action against Daesh. On 8 December 2014, squadron members both past and present held a service at Saint-Omer to mark 100 years since No. 9 Squadron was first formed. After Parliament approved strikes in Syria on 2 December 2015, No. IX (B) Squadron Tornado GR.4s carried attacks the same day on Daesh owned oil fields in al-Omar, Syria.

On 14 April 2018, No. IX (B) Squadron aircrew participated in the missile strikes against Syria in response to the Syrian government's suspected chemical attack in Douma. On 10 July 2018, nine Tornado GR.4s of No. IX (B) Squadron and No. 31 Squadron participated in a flypast over London to celebrate the Royal Air Force's 100th anniversary. On 6 November 2018, the RAF unveiled Tornado GR.4 ZG775 in a special commemorative No. IX (B) Squadron scheme to celebrate the squadron's 37 years of Tornado operations, the first of three Tornado retirement schemes to be made public. 

On 4 and 5 February 2019, the eight Tornado GR.4s of No. IX (B) Squadron and No. 31 Squadron that had been deployed to RAF Akrotiri returned home to RAF Marham ahead of the Tornado's retirement on 31 March 2019. Nos. IX (B) and 31 Squadrons held a joint parade at RAF Marham on 14 March 2019 to mark the impending disbandment of the Tornado GR Force. Although the parade flypast was Tornado's last planned sortie in RAF service, both squadrons maintained readiness for operations until the type's out-of-service date of 31 March 2019. The two squadron commanders simultaneously lowered their pennants at 0931hrs GMT on the following day, making No. IX(B) the world's first and the RAF's joint-last operational Tornado squadron.

Eurofighter Typhoon (2019 onwards)

Four Typhoon FGR4s (ZJ913, ZJ921, ZJ924 and ZJ935) were assigned to No. IX (B) Squadron (Designate) at RAF Lossiemouth in February 2019, the first appearing in squadron markings on 13 February. No. IX (B) Squadron re-equipped as an aggressor and air defence squadron operating Eurofighter Typhoon Tranche 1 at 0931hrs GMT on 1 April 2019, thereby continuing in unbroken service upon Tornado's retirement. The squadron marked its change of aircraft, role and location with a further parade on 2 May 2019, having formally reformed on 1 April. 

On 24 March 2020, No. IX (B) Squadron were awarded the battle honour 'Afghanistan 2001–2014' (without the right to emblazon) by Her Majesty Queen Elizabeth II due to their participation in Operation Herrick. To mark the 75th anniversary of VE Day on 8 May 2020, a pair of No. IX (B) Squadron Typhoons performed a flypast over Edinburgh. On 12 May 2020, the squadron participated in Exercise Point Blank 20-2 alongside Typhoon FGR4s from RAF Coningsby and Lossiemouth, F-35B Lightnings from RAF Marham, as well as F-15C Eagles of the 493rd FS and F-15E Strike Eagles of the 494th FS – based at RAF Lakenheath, Suffolk. On 16 November 2020, the Bats deployed Typhoons to Konya Air Base in Turkey to conduct training alongside locally based General Dynamics F-16 Fighting Falcons.

On 23 April 2021, four Typhoons from No. IX (B) Squadron deployed to Mihail Kogălniceanu Air Base, Romania, to carry out enhanced Air Policing (eAP) on behalf of NATO.

Aircraft operated
Aircraft operated include:

 Royal Aircraft Factory B.E.2a (Dec 1914–Feb 1915)
 Farman MF.7 (Dec 1914–Feb 1915; Apr 1915–Nov 1915)
 Blériot XI (Dec 1914–Mar 1915; Apr 1915–Aug 1915)
 Farman MF.11 (Dec 1914–Mar 1915)
 Blériot XI Parasol (Jan 1915–Mar 1915)
 Royal Aircraft Factory B.E.2b (Jan 1915–Feb 1915)
 Royal Aircraft Factory B.E.2c (Jan 1915–Feb 1915; Aug 1915–Oct 1916)
 Royal Aircraft Factory B.E.2 (Apr 1915–Jul 1915)
 Royal Aircraft Factory B.E.8a (Jul 1915–Nov 1915)
 Avro 504 (Jul 1915–Nov 1915)
 Martinsyde S.1 (Jul 1915–Nov 1915)
 Royal Aircraft Factory R.E.7 (Nov 1915–Nov 1915)
 Bristol Scout (Dec 1915–Jun 1916)
 Royal Aircraft Factory B.E.2d (Jun 1916–Sep 1916)
 Royal Aircraft Factory B.E.2e (Aug 1916–Jun 1917)
 Royal Aircraft Factory R.E.8 (May 1917–May 1919)
 Bristol F.2b (Jul 1918–Oct 1918; Feb 1919–Jul 1919)
 Vickers Vimy (Apr 1924–Oct 1925)
 Vickers Virginia Mk.IV (Sep 1924–Mar 1927)
 Vickers Virginia Mk.V (Jan 1925–May 1926)
 Vickers Virginia Mk.VI (Jun 1925–Apr 1927)
 Vickers Virginia Mk.VII (Jul 1926–Jun 1930)
 Vickers Virginia Mk.VIII (Jan 1927–Mar 1927)
 Vickers Virginia Mk.IX (Jul 1927–Feb 1932)
 Vickers Virginia Mk.X (Jan 1929–Apr 1936)
 Handley Page Heyford Mk.III (Mar 1936–May 1939)
 Vickers Wellington Mk.I (Jan 1939–Dec 1939)
 Vickers Wellington Mk.Ia (Sep 1939–Sep 1940)
 Vickers Wellington Mk.Ic (Feb 1940–Oct 1941; May 1942–Jun 1942)
 Vickers Wellington Mk.II (Mar 1941–Aug 1941)
 Vickers Wellington Mk.III (Jul 1941–Aug 1942)
 Avro Lancaster Mk.I (Sep 1942–Dec 1945; May 1946–Jul 1946)
 Avro Lancaster Mk.III (Sep 1942–Dec 1945; May 1946–Jul 1946)
 Avro Lancaster Mk.VII (Nov 1945–Apr 1946)
 Avro Lincoln B.2 (Jul 1946–May 1952)
 English Electric Canberra B.2 (May 1952–Jun 1956)
 English Electric Canberra B.6 (Sep 1955–Jul 1961)
 Avro Vulcan B.2 (Apr 1962–Apr 1982)
 Panavia Tornado GR.1 (Jan 1982–1999)
 Panavia Tornado GR.4 (May 1998–Mar 2019)
 Eurofighter Typhoon FGR.4 (Feb 2019–present)

Affiliations
In March 2017, the squadron was twinned with No. 9 Squadron of the Pakistan Air Force.

See also
List of RAF squadrons

Notes

References
 

Ministry of Defence (11 October 2017), "Royal Air Force squadrons recognised for gallantry".

Further reading
 Lewis, Peter. Squadron Histories: R.F.C, R.N.A.S and R.A.F., 1912–59. London: Putnam, 1959.
 Thorburn, Gordon. Bombers, First and Last. London: Anova Books, 2006. .
 Thorburn, Gordon. No Need to Die. Yeovil: Haynes Publishing, 2009. .

External links

Royal Air Force - 9 Squadron

Military units and formations established in 1914
009 Squadron
009 Squadron
RAF Marham units
1914 establishments in the United Kingdom